The University of Washington School of Law is the law school of the University of Washington, located on the northwest corner of the main campus in Seattle, Washington.

The 2023 U.S. News & World Report law school rankings place Washington at #49,  making it the highest-ranking law school in the Pacific Northwest.

The school was first organized in 1899. The current law building, the William H. Gates Hall, was completed and occupied in September 2003, funded by and named after William H. Gates Sr., the father of Microsoft-founder Bill Gates. Its architecture is modern and energy-efficient, with windows and skylights allowing natural light to fill the library and corridors.  The school was previously located in the second Condon Hall from 1974–2003, located several blocks west of the main campus.  From 1933-74 the law school occupied the first Condon Hall in The Quad, which was renamed "Gowen Hall" in 1974.

As of 2008, the enrollment was 671 students (all full-time), the faculty numbered 118 (66 full-time), and the student/faculty ratio was 11:1.

The school is fully accredited by the American Bar Association and has been a member of the Association of American Law Schools since 1909.

The UW School of Law has a reputation as a collegial institution; for many years the school did not rank its students, and just started ranking students in bands in 2007.

According to UW School of Law's 2013 ABA-required disclosures, 64.5% of the Class of 2013 obtained full-time, long-term, bar passage-required employment nine months after graduation, excluding solo practitioners.

Admissions
For the class entering in the fall of 2013, 686 out of 2,624 J.D. applicants were offered admission (26.1%), with 143 matriculating (20.84% of those offered admission). The 25th and 75th LSAT percentiles for the 2013 entering class were 161 and 165, respectively, with a median of 164. The 25th and 75th undergraduate GPA percentiles were 3.46 and 3.80, respectively, with a mean of 3.64. Washington residents made up 70.6 percent of the entering class; 27.9 percent of students were minorities.

Facilities

William H. Gates Hall opened in September 2003. The building houses classrooms, student lounge, a coffee/snack kiosk, locker areas, the Marian Gould Gallagher Law Library, and faculty, administration and student organization offices.

The Marian Gould Gallagher Law Library houses a collection of more than 650,000 volumes

In addition to an extensive research collection, it supports the Asian Law, Sustainable International Development Law, and tax graduate programs and serves as a federal depository for selected U.S. government documents. A staff of 38 facilitates access to a wide variety of legal information resources and services.

U.S. News & World Report has ranked the law librarianship program at the School at #1 in the country for the past three years.

Degrees and curriculum

The School of Law offers the Juris Doctor (J.D.) degree along with Master of Laws (LL.M.), Master of Jurisprudence (M.J.) and Ph.D. degrees.

J.D. students can also choose from one of nine specializations: Asian Law, Dispute Resolution, Environmental Law, Global Business, Health Law, Intellectual Property, and International and Comparative Law, Law, Business & Entrepreneurship and Public Service Law. The Law School also offers the opportunity to undertake a concurrent degree program, such as a J.D./Master of Business Administration (M.B.A.) dual degree.

The Master of Jurisprudence (M.J.) program is designed for non-lawyers who seek a deeper knowledge of law and regulations.  It serves as both an introduction to law in general and a specialization in students’ specific legal interests, building useful, marketable skills and teaching students to recognize and respond to legal issues in their professional careers.  The M.J. program holds several Information Sessions in Winter and Spring.

Students who already hold J.D. degrees can seek an LL.M. degree in one of the school's programs: Global Business, Intellectual Property Law and Policy, Tax, General Law, Health Law, Asian and Comparative Law, or Law of Sustainable International Development. A PhD. degree is also available in Asian and Comparative Law.

Clinical law programs and centers

The UW School of Law clinical law program started in 1979. Nearly 60% of each JD class enrolls in one of the following clinics: Berman Environmental Law, Children and Youth Advocacy, Entrepreneurial Law, Federal Tax, Immigration Law, Innocence Project Northwest, Mediation, Technology Law and Public Policy, and Tribal Court Public Defense.

The UW School is home to several centers and projects, including Global Business Law Institute, Asian Law Center, Center for Advanced Study & Research on Intellectual Property (CASRIP), Center for Law in Science and Global Health, Global Health & Justice Project, Native American Law Center, and Shidler Center for Law, Commerce & Technology.

Scholarly publications
The School has four legal publications: Washington International Law Journal, the Washington Journal of Environmental Law & Policy, the Washington Journal of Law, Technology & Arts, and Washington Law Review.

Washington Law Review 

The Washington Law Review is the flagship law review at the University of Washington.  The first Washington Law Review was established in 1919 and published only a single volume, while the current publication history starts in 1925. From 1936 to 1961, the journal was titled Washington Law Review and State Bar Journal.  The Law Review publishes an annual volume of legal scholarship consisting of four issues.

Post-graduate employment

According to UW School of Law's official 2013 ABA-required disclosures, 64.5% of the Class of 2013 obtained full-time, long-term, bar passage-required employment nine months after graduation, excluding solo-practitioners. UW School of Law ranked 34th among ABA-approved law schools in terms of the percentage of 2013 graduates with non-school-funded, full-time, long-term, bar passage required jobs nine months after graduation.

UW School of Law's Law School Transparency under-employment score is 15.8%, indicating the percentage of the Class of 2013 unemployed, pursuing an additional degree, or working in a non-professional, short-term, or part-time job nine months after graduation. 88.5% of the Class of 2013 was employed in some capacity while 2.7% were pursuing graduate degrees and 8.7% were unemployed nine months graduation.

Bar passage rate in July 2013 was 93.8%.

Costs

The total cost of attendance (indicating the cost of tuition, fees, and living expenses) at UW School of Law for the 2013–2014 academic year is $49,734 for Washington residents and $62,775 for non-residents.

The Law School Transparency estimated debt-financed cost of attendance for three years is $207,401.

Notable alumni
Notable alumni include:

Walter M. French (1901): Washington Supreme Court Justice 
Vivian Carkeek (1901): noted Seattle attorney
Walter B. Beals (1901): Washington Supreme Court Justice 
Othilia Carroll Beals (1901): justice of the peace in Seattle during World War I
Takuji Yamashita (1902), Japanese American civil rights activist
Lloyd Llewellyn Black (1912): U.S. District Court Judge for the Western District and then the Eastern District of Washington
Samuel M. Driver (1916): Chief Judge, U.S. District Court for the Eastern District of Washington 
Lewis B. Schwellenbach (1917): U.S. Senator, U.S. District Court Judge for the Eastern District of Washington, and U.S. Secretary of Labor 
Matthew W. Hill (1917): Washington Supreme Court Justice 
Don G. Abel (1919): Washington Supreme Court Justice 
Walter H. Hodge (1919): Judge, United States District Court for the District of Alaska 
Arthur B. Langlie (1925): Governor of Washington
Charles L. Powell (1925): U.S. District Court Judge for the Eastern District of Washington 
Joseph A. Mallery (1926): Washington Supreme Court Justice 
John E. Reilly Jr. (1928): Member of the Wisconsin State Assembly and Milwaukee County judge
Warren Magnuson (1929): U.S. Senator 
Marion Zioncheck (1929): U.S. Representative 
Thor C. Tollefson (1930): U.S. Representative 
William T. Beeks (1932): Judge, U.S. District Court Judge for the Western District of Washington
Frederick G. Hamley (1932): Washington Supreme Court Justice; Judge on the United States Court of Appeals for the Ninth Circuit 
Albert Rosellini (1933): Governor of Washington
Hugh J. Rosellini (1933): Chief Justice of the Washington Supreme Court.
Henry M. Jackson (1935): U.S. Senator 
Montgomery O. Koelsch (1935): Judge, U.S. Court of Appeals for the Ninth Circuit 
Eugene A. Wright (1937): Judge, U.S. Court of Appeals for the Ninth Circuit 
Stanley C. Soderland (1939): Supreme Court Clerk to William O. Douglas; King County Superior Court Judge
Vern Countryman (1942): Supreme Court Clerk to William O. Douglas; Professor, Yale Law School; Dean, University of New Mexico School of Law; Royall Professor of Law, Harvard Law School
Lucile Lomen (1944): law clerk to William O. Douglas and the first woman to serve as a law clerk for a U.S. Supreme Court justice.
Donald R. Colvin (1945): law clerk to William O. Douglas
August P. Mardesich (1948): Member and majority leader of the Washington State House of Representatives
William C. Goodloe (1948): Washington Supreme Court Chief Justice 
Floyd Hicks (1948): U.S. Representative
Jack Tuell (1948): United Methodist Church Bishop of Los Angeles from 1980 to 1992.
William H. Gates, Sr. (1950): Father of Microsoft founder Bill Gates. Co-founder of law firm Preston Gates & Ellis (now K&L Gates), and of the Bill and Melinda Gates Foundation
Walter T. McGovern (1950): U.S. District Court Judge for the Western District of Washington
James A. Andersen (1951): Washington Supreme Court Chief Justice
 James M. Dolliver (1952): aide to Governor Daniel J. Evans and Washington Supreme Court Chief Justice 
Alan A. McDonald (1952): U.S. District Court Judge for the Eastern District of Washington 
Carolyn R. Dimmick (1953): U.S. District Court Judge for the Western District of Washington; first woman on the Washington Supreme Court 
Wing Luke: Washington State Assistant Attorney General and first Asian American to hold elected office in Washington 
Charles Z. Smith (1955): Washington State Supreme Court Justice and the state's first African American justice 
Jack E. Tanner (1955): U.S. District Court Judge for the Eastern District and Western District of Washington 
Betty Fletcher (1956): Judge on the U.S. Court of Appeals for the Ninth Circuit 
Tom Foley (1957): Speaker of the U.S. House of Representatives and U.S. Ambassador to Japan
Joseph Jerome Farris (1958):  Judge on the U.S. Court of Appeals for the Ninth Circuit
Robert Jensen Bryan (1958): Judge, U.S. District Court for the Western District of Washington
William Fremming Nielsen (1962): U.S. District Court Judge for the Eastern District of Washington 
Gerry L. Alexander (1964):  Washington Supreme Court Chief Justice 
Norm Maleng (1966): Longtime King County prosecuting attorney
Jeffrey H. Brotman (1967): Co-founder of the Costco Wholesale Corporation 
Norm Dicks (1968): U.S. Representative 
Lucas A. Powe Jr. (1968): Law Clerk to William O. Douglas, Professor at The University of Texas School of Law and Legal Historian 
Richard B. Sanders (1969): Washington Supreme Court Justice 
Tom Chambers (1969): Washington Supreme Court Justice 
James M. Johnson (1970): Washington Supreme Court Justice 
Johnson Toribiong (J.D., 1972; LL.M, 1973): President of Palau
 Bill Foley (1974): Businessman and owner of the Vegas Golden Knights
Richard A. Jones (1975): U.S. District Court Judge for the Western District of Washington 
Bobbe Bridge (1976): Washington Supreme Court Justice
Mark Sidran (1976): Former Seattle City Attorney
Robert Lasnik (1978): Chief Judge, U.S. District Court for the Western District of Washington 
Ricardo S. Martinez (1980): U.S. District Court Judge for the Western District of Washington
Paul D. Wohlers (1982): U.S. Ambassador to Macedonia
Stanley Bastian (1983): U.S. District Court Judge for the Eastern District of Washington
 Bruce Harrell (1984): Mayor of Seattle
 Joseph L. Hoffmann (1984): law clerk to Justice William Rehnquist, U.S. Supreme Court, professor at Indiana University Mauer School of Law
Jenny Durkan (1985): U.S. Attorney for the Western District of Washington; First openly gay U.S. Attorney; former Mayor of Seattle 
Marco A. Hernandez (1986): U.S. District Court Judge for the District of Oregon 
Adam Smith (1990): U.S. Representative 
Michael McGinn (1992): Mayor of Seattle
Raúl Labrador (1995): U.S. Representative 
Raquel Montoya-Lewis (1995): Washington Supreme Court Justice
Stan Lippmann (1998): Perennial candidate and anti-vaccination activist.
Jill Otake (1998), U.S. District Court Judge for the District of Hawaii
David Estudillo (1999): U.S. District Court Judge for the Western District of Washington
Rod Dembowski (2001): Member, King County Council District 1
Dylan Orr (2009): First openly transgender person appointed to a U.S. presidential administration
Shon Hopwood (2014): Bank robber turned jailhouse lawyer, D.C. Circuit law clerk, and law professor at Georgetown University Law Center

See also

 Dan Fenno Henderson

References

External links
UW School of Law - official site
 List of AALS members

 
Law
Law schools in Washington (state)
Educational institutions established in 1899
1899 establishments in Washington (state)